The 2010 Estonian Figure Skating Championships took place between 19 and 20 December 2009 in Tallinn. Skaters competed in the disciplines of men's singles, ladies' singles, pair skating, and ice dancing on the senior and junior levels. The results were used to choose the teams to the 2010 World Championships and the 2010 European Championships.

Senior results

Men

Ladies

Pairs

Ice dancing

Junior results
The 2010 Estonian Junior Figure Skating Championships were held on 5–7 February 2010 in Tallinn.

Men

Ladies

 WD = Withdrawn

Pairs

Ice dancing

References

Estonian Figure Skating Championships
Figure Skating Championships
Estonian Figure Skating Championships, 2010
2009 in figure skating